The 2018–19 European Rugby Challenge Cup pool stage is the first stage of the competition in the fifth season of the European Rugby Challenge Cup.  The competition involves twenty teams competing across five pools of four teams for eight quarter-final places – awarded to the five pool winners and the three top-ranked pool runners-up.  The pool stage begins on 13 October 2018 and is due to be completed on 18 January 2019.

Seeding
The 20 competing teams were seeded and split into four tiers; seeding was based on performance in their respective domestic leagues. Where promotion and relegation is in effect in a league, the promoted team was seeded last, or (if multiple teams are promoted) by performance in the lower competition.

Teams will be taken from a league in order of rank and put into a tier. A draw will be used to allocate two second seeds to Tier 1; the remaining team goes into Tier 2. This allocation indirectly determines which fourth-seeded team entered Tier 2, while the others enter Tier 3.

Given the nature of the Continental Shield – a competition including developing rugby nations and Italian clubs not competing in the Pro14 – the two qualifiers from that competition were automatically included in Tier 4 and are seeded equally, despite officially being ranked 1 and 2 from that competition.

The brackets show each team's seeding and their league (for example, 1 Top 14 indicates the team was seeded 1st from the Top 14).

Pool stage

The draw will take place on 20 June 2018 in the Olympic Museum, Lausanne, Switzerland.

Teams in the same pool will play each other twice, both at home and away in the group stage, that will begin in October 2018, and continue through to January 2019, before the pool winners and three best runners-up progressed to the quarter finals.

Teams will be awarded competition points, based on match result. Teams receive four points for a win, two points for a draw, one attacking bonus point for scoring four or more tries in a match and one defensive bonus point for losing a match by seven points or fewer.

In the event of a tie between two or more teams, the following tie-breakers will be used, as directed by EPCR:
 Where teams have played each other
 The club with the greater number of competition points from only matches involving tied teams.
 If equal, the club with the best aggregate points difference from those matches.
 If equal, the club that scored the most tries in those matches.
 Where teams remain tied and/or have not played each other in the competition (i.e. are from different pools)
 The club with the best aggregate points difference from the pool stage.
 If equal, the club that scored the most tries in the pool stage.
 If equal, the club with the fewest players suspended in the pool stage.
 If equal, the drawing of lots will determine a club's ranking.

Pool 1

Cancelled due to unplayable pitch caused by extreme weather (snow), with no suitable alternative venue available.  Game would later be awarded an automatic bonus point win to Northampton Saints.

Pool 2

Pool 3

Pool 4

Pool 5

See also
2018–19 European Rugby Champions Cup

Notes

References

2018–19 European Rugby Challenge Cup
2018